is a Japanese actor and musician who is represented by the talent agencies, Amuse, Inc., and later, Office Nigun Niiba.

Early life 
On October 13, 1978, Toba was born in Wakayama prefecture, Japan.

Career 
Toba won the Japan Academy Prize Newcomer Award, the Osaka Film Festival Newcomer Prize, and the Kinema Junpō Best Ten Newcomer Actor Award. He also put a force on music activities, which he released the mini album, Inner Vision in November 2004. Toba's activities were in the band SpraSight, and now formed the band Razhead Modic, which is active in the music world. The band has been active as Geenie.

Filmography

TV series

Films

References

External links
 
 
 

1978 births
Living people
Japanese male actors
Japanese musicians
Actors from Wakayama Prefecture
Musicians from Wakayama Prefecture
People from Arida, Wakayama